Eversley & California Football Club is a football club based in Eversley, Hampshire, England.

History
Eversley Football Club was established in 1910. The club played in the Aldershot Senior League and Surrey County Intermediate League (Western), before becoming founder members of the Surrey Elite Intermediate Football League in 2008. They won the league in its first season, also winning the league's Challenge Cup. They were subsequently promoted to Division One of the Combined Counties League.

In 2012 the club merged with California, a youth football club established in 1975 in California in Berkshire, changing its name to Eversley & California. In 2013–14 they were Division One runners-up, but were unable to take promotion due to restrictions on use of the floodlights at the ground.

Ground
The club play at the Eversley Sports Association on Fox Lane. The ground was originally the home of California, who developed the site, which was reclaimed land, after receiving a Football Foundation grant of £666,556 in 2007. The ground opened in 2009, featuring a railed pitch and a 57-seat stand. The entire complex cost £2.1m. When floodlights were installed, their use was restricted to 15 October–1 April. However, this was later extended from 1 August–30 April.

Honours
Surrey Elite Intermediate League
Champions 2008–09
Challenge Cup winners 2008–09

Records
Best FA Vase performance: Second qualifying round, 2014–15, 2016–17

See also
Eversley & California F.C. managers

References

External links

Football clubs in England
Football clubs in Hampshire
Association football clubs established in 1910
1910 establishments in England
Hart District
Aldershot & District Football League
Surrey County Intermediate League (Western)
Surrey Elite Intermediate Football League
Combined Counties Football League